Bicyclus vansoni is a butterfly in the family Nymphalidae. It is found in Angola, the Democratic Republic of the Congo, Burundi, western Tanzania, Malawi and northern Zambia. The habitat consists of Brachystegia woodland and forest margins.

References

Elymniini
Butterflies described in 1965